Donald Andrew Clune (born July 31, 1952 in Havertown, Pennsylvania) is a former American football wide receiver in the National Football League.  He played college football at the University of Pennsylvania where he earned All-American honors in both football and track.  He was drafted by the New York Giants in the 1974 NFL Draft.  Clune played three seasons in the NFL with the Giants and the Seattle Seahawks.  He graduated from Cardinal O'Hara High School.

1952 births
Living people
Players of American football from Philadelphia
American football wide receivers
Penn Quakers football players
New York Giants players
Seattle Seahawks players